The Liberty Hall Site, near Lexington, Virginia, contains the remains of the early predecessor of Washington and Lee University.  The Liberty Hall Academy was chartered as a degree-granting institution by the Virginia legislature in 1782, and was located in a wood-frame building. This building burned down in 1783, as did its replacement in 1790. In 1793 a new three-story stone building was constructed, as was a steward's house, and these buildings were followed in subsequent years by additional buildings. The roof of the main school building caught fire in 1802, and the ensuing blaze gutted the building's interior. It was declared unfit to restore, and the institution relocated into Lexington.

The university conducted excavations of the site in the 1970s. The site was listed on the National Register of Historic Places in 1977.

See also
National Register of Historic Places listings in Rockbridge County, Virginia

References

External links
Liberty Hall - Washington and Lee University

Archaeological sites on the National Register of Historic Places in Virginia
National Register of Historic Places in Rockbridge County, Virginia
School buildings completed in 1793
Washington and Lee University
Historic districts on the National Register of Historic Places in Virginia
1793 establishments in Virginia